John Lawrence (born 15 September 1933 in Hastings) is an English illustrator and wood engraver.

He has twice won the Francis Williams Award for illustration (sponsored by the Victoria and Albert Museum, London), and twice been runner-up for the Kurt Emil - Maschler Award. He has also published children's books in his own right including This Little Chick which was a New York Times Book Review Best Illustrated Children’s Book of the Year. He was master of the Art Workers' Guild in 1990, and now lives in Cambridge.

Education
Born in Hastings in 1933, John Lawrence was educated in Salesian schools, first in Burwash, Sussex then in Cowley, Oxfordshire, before attending Hastings School of Art (1951 - 1953).  After National Service in West Africa he moved to the Central School of Art and Design (1955–1957) where he was introduced to wood engraving by Gertrude Hermes.

Teaching
In the 1960s he taught at Brighton School of Art and then as a visiting professor of illustration at Camberwell School of Art until 1993.

Until 2010 he taught at Cambridge School of Art, lecturing on the M.A. course in Children's Book Illustration.

Illustration

He has illustrated more than 200 books, both adult and children's ranging from Shakespeare to Alan Ahlberg including the best-selling Watership Down by Richard Adams and has recently worked with Philip Pullman producing all the illustrations for Lyra's Oxford and Once Upon a Time in the North

His work is represented in the Ashmolean, the Victoria and Albert Museum, Manchester Metropolitan University and Seven Stories in Newcastle.

Further reading
 Ian Rogerson, Through the Looking-Glass: the Illustrations of John Lawrence (2006)
 John Lawrence (2002. Primrose Academy) (series: the Engraver's Cut)
 Sketchbook drawings by John Lawrence with a recorded commentary by John Lawrence, compiled and edited by Tom Colverson ... (1991. Previous Parrot Press) 
 D. Martin, 'John Lawrence', in Douglas Martin, The Telling Line  Essays On Fifteen Contemporary Book Illustrators (1989), p. 167-186
 A Selection of Wood Engravings John Lawrence (1986. Camberwell Press) [Limited edition]
 Peter Guy, 'The Wood Engravings of John Lawrence', in Matrix; 3 (1983 Winter), p. 21-41
 Lesley MacDonald, 'Der Illustrator John Lawrence', in Illustration 63, 18/3 (1981 November), p. 83-88

References

External links
Incomplete bibliography
"The spitsticker wizard: John Lawrence uses tools and techniques that go back to the 18th century, yet his illustrations look bang up to date", The Guardian, Saturday 21 June 2003
 

1933 births
People from Hastings
English illustrators
English wood engravers
British children's book illustrators
Alumni of the Central School of Art and Design
Academics of Anglia Ruskin University
Academics of the University of the Arts London
Academics of the University of Brighton
Living people
British children's writers
Masters of the Art Worker's Guild